The Spirit of Houston consists of the Cougar Marching Band and other spirit groups at the University of Houston, including the “UH” Cheer teams, the Cougar Dolls Dance Team, the “UH” Feature Twirlers, the Mascots, and the Cougar Brass. The Spirit of Houston is currently under the direction of “Director of Athletic Bands” and “Spirit Groups”, Cameron Kubos. The Cougar Marching Band is widely known for performing in a wide variety of styles of marching band (corps, military, show, etc.). The CMB is also known for its characteristic tonal quality, following in the tradition pioneered by Bill Moffit, Robert Mayes, and David Bertman. Three men who led the Spirit of Houston for over three decades between them. The band consists of about 270 students, about one third of which are music majors. Other past directors have included Marc Martin, Troy Bennefield and John Alstrin.

History

From the late 1960s to the early 1980s, the Spirit of Houston was under the direction of Bill Moffit, an innovator in the marching band field.  Moffit is credited with creating the Patterns in Motion marching style made famous during his tenure at UH.  Patterns in Motion quickly became very popular among many other collegiate and high school marching bands as the style quickly spread across the nation.  He is also well known as an arranger of both traditional band tunes and modern popular songs.

Following the departure of Moffit to Purdue University Greg Talford became director.  Talford, hailing from Michigan, moved the band toward drum corps style and required memorization of all music and marching patterns, held regular sectionals, and both challenged and raised the bar for the band. Robert Mayes followed Greg Talford, coming to UH after holding positions at Texas Tech and the University of Wyoming with a reputation for high-energy performances, was named the director of the Cougar Marching Band. Under his direction, the Cougar Marching Band continued to set a standard of music.  Mayes led the band to become internationally known.  During his tenure, the band traveled to Japan, England, Ireland, France, and Mexico.

In 2000, David Bertman was hired as the director of the Spirit of Houston. He was charged with the task of maintaining the tradition that had been so firmly entrenched by the bands of Moffit and Mayes. Under his direction, the Cougar Marching Band continued its musical excellence and led the University of Houston in spirit is support of the Houston Cougars football team. Coupled with the team's success, the Spirit of Houston has contributed greatly to a growing excitement among students and alumni to see the Cougars return to the upper echelon of college football.

Following Bertman's promotion to Director of Bands, Troy Bennefield was hired to become the marching band director in 2011. Cameron Kubos became the director of the Spirit of Houston in the summer of 2018. The UH Drumline is currently under the direction of Jamey Kollar.

In 2004 the Spirit of Houston was featured in the Super Bowl XXXVIII halftime show.

On November 14, 2015, the Spirit of Houston performed "Gwan" with the Gulf Coast Soul Band, The Suffers, during the football halftime show.

During the spring 2018 semester, associate director Marc Martin resigned from his position after being found guilty in an investigation conducted by the University of inappropriate behavior toward multiple students.

On September 24, 2022, the Spirit of Houston performed "Red Alert" alongside Paul Wall and Bun B, during the football halftime show.

Music
The Spirit of Houston's primary repertoire includes the following:

"Cougar Fight Song", the university's official fight song
"Eat 'Em Up", a secondary fight song of the university which was originally written by director Bill Moffit, and subsequently used by most other college marching bands today
"The Horse"
"Womp Womp"
“Hustlin’”
"June 27th"

Cheer
The UH Cheer team is under the direction of Spirit Coordinator Khristal Harbert and Cheer Coach Cassidy Burkle.

Cougar Dolls
The UH Cougar Dolls are under the direction of Spirit Coordinator Khristal Harbert and Dolls Coach Amanda Duran.

Twirlers
The UH Feature Twirlers have a long history of successful and talented twirlers.

Cougar Brass
The Cougar Brass is the University of Houston's basketball band and is currently under the direction of Cameron Kubos.

See also

Moores School of Music

References

External links

 University of Houston Bands
 University of Houston - Home
 Moores School of Music - Band Profile
 Moores School of Music - Home Page

University of Houston traditions
Musical groups from Houston
American Athletic Conference marching bands
Musical groups established in 1947
1947 establishments in Texas